The following highways are numbered 402:

Canada
 Newfoundland and Labrador Route 402
 Ontario Highway 402

Costa Rica
 National Route 402

Japan
 Japan National Route 402

United States
  Colorado State Highway 402
 Florida:
  Florida State Road 402
  County Road 402 (Brevard County, Florida)
  Georgia State Route 402 (unsigned designation for Interstate 20)
  Maryland Route 402
 New York:
  New York State Route 402 (former)
 County Route 402 (Albany County, New York)
  County Route 402 (Erie County, New York)
  North Carolina Highway 402 (former)
  Oregon Route 402
  Pennsylvania Route 402
  Puerto Rico Highway 402
  Rhode Island Route 402
  South Carolina Highway 402
 Texas:
  Texas State Highway Loop 402 (former)
  Farm to Market Road 402
  Virginia State Route 402
 Virginia State Route 402 (former)